Pterocapoeta maroccana  is a species of cyprinid fish. It is found only in Morocco.

Labeobarbus marocanna (Pterocapoeta maroccana) is a species of medium to large Labeobarbus species endemic to Morocco, it can be found from the Eastern part of the country from Oued Moulouya to as western as possibly Agadir, its the only known species of Labeobarbus found north of the Sahara, all other species are only found in the afro tropical regions.

References

Cyprininae
Cyprinid fish of Africa
Endemic fauna of Morocco
Taxa named by Albert Günther
Taxonomy articles created by Polbot